Sleep Number is an American manufacturer that makes the Sleep Number and Comfortaire beds, as well as foundations and bedding accessories. The company is based in Minneapolis, Minnesota. In addition to its Minnesota headquarters, Sleep Number has manufacturing and distribution facilities in South Carolina and Utah. As of 2018, the company employed 4,220 people across the United States.

History 
In 1980, the category of adjustable air-supported sleep systems was invented by a private company, Comfortaire Corporation of South Carolina. Robert Walker left Comfortaire and he and his wife, JoAnne Walker, formed a new company in 1987 called Select Comfort. 

Select Comfort acquired the Comfortaire Corporation, its major competitor, in January 2013.  In March 2017, Select Comfort announced that they would no longer offer the Comfortaire lineup of Air Beds to their third party retailers/dealers. In November 2017, Select Comfort Corporation changed their corporate name to Sleep Number Corporation.

The company's TV commercials used to feature actress Lindsay Wagner. Other endorsers include conservative radio talk show hosts Glenn Beck, Paul Harvey and Laura Ingraham; Rush Limbaugh also previously advertised the product, but the company pulled its advertising in the wake of the Rush Limbaugh–Sandra Fluke controversy. Sleep Number is the official sleep and wellness partner of the NFL. Its commercials also feature star athletes like the Dallas Cowboys' Dak Prescott.  

Robert Walker left Select Comfort in 2001 and formed an alternative energy company, Bixby Energy Systems. In 2014, he was convicted and sentenced to 25 years in prison for fraud, tax evasion, witness tampering and conspiracy for repeatedly misleading investors about Bixby Energy.

, Sleep Number holds 23 issued or pending U.S. patents and 40 issued or pending foreign patents for its products. In September 2017, According to the Global Mattress Toppers market research report, Sleep Number was among the key players of Mattress Toppers market.

In January 2020, Sleep Number announced a collaboration with Mayo Clinic to further sleep science research and cardiovascular medicine, valued at $10M over five years.

Sleep Number Bed 
The company manufactures the Sleep Number® bed, an adjustable air mattress. The "Sleep Number® setting" is a setting that adjusts the firmness or softness of the mattress on each side of the bed using air pressure (dual air chambers, one on each side), with higher numbers (up to 100) denoting higher pressure and more firmness, and lower numbers denoting less pressure and more softness. Sleep Number's latest line of beds, the 360 Smart Bed®, launched in 2017. The "Smart" features include Dual Adjustability for adjustable comfort and firmness on each of the bed; Responsive Air® technology, which allows the mattress to respond to movements and automatically adjusts firmness; and SleepIQ® technology, which shows sleep quality via a SleepIQ® score, with personal insights for better sleep.

Legal issues and controversy  
In 2005, Sleepy's, which is now Mattress Firm, sued Select Comfort, currently known as Sleep Number, for disparaging the quality and comfort of Personal Preference beds made by Sleepy's, and said Sleepy’s offered inferior warranties. The case revolved around whether or not Select Comfort violated a 2005 contract that let Sleepy’s sell a Select Comfort product, while Select Comfort sold an arguably superior product in its own stores. The case was originally dismissed in 2015 by U.S. District Judge Joanna Seybert in Central Islip, New York but later revived by the 2nd U.S. Circuit Court of Appeals in 2018 after finding out that the lower court misinterpreted part of the New York law. The appeals court also threw out a $2.63 million legal fee award for Sleep Number. In 2015, a class action lawsuit was filed against Sleep Number and Leggett & Platt accusing the companies of failing to uphold the warranty and fix a bed they sold to customers, David and Katina Spade. The suit claims there were several other customers who experienced similar issues.

On November 9, 2019 Dires LLC, the legal entity that sells the Personal Comfort Bed, filed a lawsuit in Minnesota state court accusing Sleep Number of monopolization, tortious interference, deceptive trade and unjust enrichment. This stems out of a previous court ruling stating that Sleep Number has no trademark rights to the phrase “number bed.” The new lawsuit claims that Sleep Number falsely told Google that it owns the trademark rights for "number bed," causing Google to deny Dires the use of the phrase to attain more clicks to its website. Dires also accused Sleep Number of targeting it with false, misleading and defamatory reviews and comments about its products. They provided evidence of Sleep Number employees posting false and negative comments about its products on Facebook and YouTube.

References

External links 
 

Manufacturing companies established in 1987
Retail companies established in 1987
Companies based in Minneapolis
Companies listed on the Nasdaq
Mattress retailers of the United States